The Estadio Aldo Cantoni is an indoor arena located in the city of San Juan, capital of San Juan Province. It is mainly use by UPCN Vóley Club and Obras Pocito for its home matches for the Serie A1, the top level of the Argentine men's volleyball league system. UPCN Vóley Club won the national league for six consecutive years, from 2010-11 to 2015-16 season.

Roller hockey is a very popular sport in Cuyo, specially in San Juan Province. This stadium has hosted five times the FIRS Roller Hockey World Cup, and it is also used by several teams for their Liga Nacional Argentina A-1 matches.

San Juan was one of the venues for the 2002 FIVB Volleyball Men's World Championship, hosting five out of six matches for Group A. The opening match of the tournament, between Argentina and Australia, was held at the Luna Park Stadium, in Buenos Aires.

The stadium was named after Aldo Cantoni (1892-1948), politician, governor of San Juan Province between 1926 and 1928, twice President of the Club Atlético Huracán, President of the Argentine Football Association and co-founder of the Unión Cívica Radical Bloquista political party.

Sporting events
 1970 Roller Hockey World Cup
 1978 Roller Hockey World Cup
 1989 Roller Hockey World Cup
 2001 Rink Hockey World Championship
 2002 FIVB Volleyball Men's World Championship
 2011 FIRS Men's Roller Hockey World Cup
 2015 Men's South American Volleyball Club Championship
 2017 Copa América de Futsal
 2018 Davis Cup tie between Argentina and Chile
 2018 Davis Cup World Group Play-offs tie between Argentina and Colombia
 Torneo Cuatro Naciones de Handball 2019

References

Indoor arenas in Argentina
Sport in San Juan Province, Argentina
Basketball venues in Argentina
Volleyball venues in Argentina